The Chinese Ambassador to Russia is the official representative of the People's Republic of China to Russia.

List of representatives

Ambassadors to the Soviet Union

Ambassadors to Russia

See also
China–Russia relations
Sino–Soviet relations

References 

Ambassadors of China to Russia
Russia
China